Port station (also: port radio station) is – according to Article 1.80 of the International Telecommunication Union´s (ITU) RR – defined as «A coast station in the port operations service.»

Each station shall be classified by the service in which it operates permanently or temporarily.

See also

References / sources 

 International Telecommunication Union (ITU)

Radio stations and systems ITU
Maritime communication